The Little Muskegon River is a  tributary of the Muskegon River in western Michigan in the United States.

See also
List of rivers of Michigan

References

Michigan  Streamflow Data from the USGS

Rivers of Michigan
Rivers of Newaygo County, Michigan
Tributaries of Lake Michigan